Nine is a musical whose original conception and music and lyrics are by Maury Yeston, with a book by Arthur Kopit. It is based on Federico Fellini's semi-autobiographical 1963 film 8½.

The show tells the story of film director Guido Contini, who is dreading his imminent 40th birthday and facing a midlife crisis, which is blocking his creative impulses and entangling him in a web of romantic difficulties in early-1960s Venice.

Conceived and written and composed by Yeston as a class project in the BMI Lehman Engel Musical Theatre Workshop in 1973, it was later adapted with a book by Mario Fratti, and then with another a book by Arthur Kopit. The original Broadway production opened in 1982 and ran for 729 performances, starring Raul Julia. The musical won five Tony Awards, including Best Musical, and has enjoyed a number of revivals.

Background
Yeston began to work on the musical in 1973. As a teenager, he had seen the Fellini film and was intrigued by its themes. "I looked at the screen and said 'That's me.' I still believed in all the dreams and ideals of what it was to be an artist, and here was a movie about an artist in trouble. It became an obsession," Yeston told the New York Times. He would go on to say "Nine was the thing I really desperately wanted to write—never thinking for a minute that it would ever be produced. The movie had a phenomenal impact on me when I saw it as a teenager when it first came out. I was fascinated with Guido who was going through a second adolescence when I was going through my first! As I grew I began to realize that there was room to explore the reactions of the inner workings of the women in Guido’s wake. I think that’s what opened the gateways of creativity for Nine—to hear from these extraordinary women. The great secret of Nine is that it took 8 1/2 and became an essay on the power of women by answering the question, “What are women to men?” And Nine tells you: they are our mothers, our sisters, our teachers, our temptresses, our judges, our nurses, our wives, our mistresses, our muses." Playwright Mario Fratti began working on the book of the musical in 1977, but the producers and director Tommy Tune eventually decided his script did not work, and brought in Arthur Kopit in 1981 to write an entirely new book, working (as Fratti had) with Maury Yeston as composer/lyricist, but now using Yeston's music, and Fellini's film, as the source. Kopit's new book, along with Yeston's now completed score, became the script that was produced on Broadway in 1982.

Fellini had entitled his film 8½ in recognition of his prior body of work, which included six full-length films, two short films, and one film that he co-directed. Yeston's title for the musical adaptation adds another half-credit to Fellini's output and refers to Guido's age during his first hallucination sequence. Yeston called the musical Nine, explaining that if you add music to 8½, "it's like half a number more."

Plot
Guido Contini, famous Italian film director, has turned forty and faces double crises: he has to shoot a film for which he can't write the script, and his wife of twenty years, the film star Luisa del Forno, may be about to leave him if he can't pay more attention to the marriage. As it turns out, it is the same crisis.

Luisa's efforts to talk to him seem to be drowned out by voices in his head: voices of women in his life, speaking through the walls of his memory, insistent, flirtatious, irresistible, potent. Women speaking beyond words (Overture delle Donne). And these are the women Guido has loved, and from whom he has derived the entire vitality of a creative life, now as stalled as his marriage.

In an attempt to find some peace and save the marriage, they go to a spa near Venice (Spa Music), where they are immediately hunted down by the press with intrusive questions about the marriage and—something Guido had not told Luisa about—his imminent film project (Not Since Chaplin).

As Guido struggles to find a story for his film, he becomes increasingly preoccupied—his interior world sometimes becoming indistinguishable from the objective world (Guido's Song). His mistress Carla arrives in Venice, calling him from her lonely hotel room (A Call from the Vatican), his producer Liliane La Fleur, former vedette of the Folies Bergeres, insists he make a musical, an idea which itself veers off into a feminine fantasy of extraordinary vividness (The Script/Folies Bergeres). And all the while, Luisa watches, the resilience of her love being consumed by anxiety for him and a gathering dismay for their lives together (My Husband Makes Movies / Only With You).

Guido's fugitive imagination, clutching at women like straws, eventually plunges through the floor of the present and into his own past where he encounters his mother, bathing a nine-year-old boy—the young Guido himself (Nine). The vision leads him to re-encounter a glorious moment on a beach with Saraghina, the prostitute and outcast to whom he went as a curious child, creeping out of his Catholic boarding school St. Sebastian, to ask her to tell him about love. Her answer, be yourself (Ti Voglio Bene / Be Italian), and the dance she taught him on the sand echoes down to the forty-year-old Guido as a talisman and a terrible reminder of the consequences of that night—punishment by the nuns and rejection by his appalled mother (The Bells of St. Sebastian). Unable to bear the incomprehensible dread of the adults, the little boy runs back to the beach to find nothing but the sand and the wind—an image of the vanishing nature of love, and the cause of Guido Contini's artistry and unanchored peril: a fugitive heart.

Back into the present, Guido is on a beach once more. With him, Claudia Nardi, a film star, muse of his greatest successes, who has flown from Paris because he needs her, but this time she does not want the role. He cannot fathom the rejection. He is enraged. He fails to understand that Claudia loves him, too, but wants him to love her as a woman 'not a spirit'—and he realizes too late that this was the real reason that she came—in order to know, and now she does. He cannot love her that way. She is in some way released to love him for what he is, and never to hope for him again. Wryly she calls him "My charming Casanova!" thereby involuntarily giving Guido the very inspiration he needs and for which has always looked to her. As Claudia lets him go with "Unusual Way," Guido grasps the last straw of all—a desperate, inspired movie—a 'spectacular in the vernacular'—set on "The Grand Canal" and cast with every woman in his life.

The improvised movie is a spectacular collision between his real life and his creative one—a film that is as self-lacerating as it is cruel, during which Carla races onto the set to announce her divorce and her delight that they can be married only to be brutally rejected by Guido in his desperate fixation with the next set-up, and which climaxes with Luisa, appalled and moved by his use of their intimacy—and even her words—as a source for the film, finally detonating with sadness and rage. Guido keeps the cameras rolling, capturing a scene of utter desolation—the women he loves, and Luisa whom he loves above all, littered like smashed porcelain across the frame of his hopelessly beautiful failure of a film. "Cut. Print!"

The film is dead. The cast leaves. They all leave. Carla, with "Simple"—words from the articulate broken heart, Claudia with a letter from Paris to say that she has married, and Luisa in a shattering exit from a marriage that has, as she says, been 'all of me' (Be On Your Own).

Guido is alone. "I Can't Make This Movie" ascends into the scream of "Guido out in space with no direction,' and he contemplates suicide. But, as the gun is at his head, there is a final life-saving interruption—from his nine-year-old self (Getting Tall), in which the young Guido points out it is time to move on. To grow up. And Guido surrenders the gun. As the women return in a reprise of the Overture (Reprises), but this time to let him go, only one is absent: Luisa. Guido feels the aching void left by the only woman he will ever love. In the 2003 Broadway production, as the boy led the women off into his own future to the strains of "Be Italian", Luisa steps into the room on the final note, and Guido turned toward her—this time ready to listen.

Productions

Workshop
Originally conceived as a male/female cast, many of the changes into a mostly all women cast were created in a workshop that rehearsed in the upstairs theatre at the New Amsterdam Theatre in the Fall of 1981. For their participation, the workshop cast was given a small percentage of the show for a limited amount of time. Kathi Moss was the only cast member of the original Broadway cast that did not participate in the workshop (Pat Ast played the role of Saraghina in the workshop).

Original Broadway production
After nineteen previews, the Broadway production, directed by Tommy Tune and choreographed by Thommie Walsh, opened on May 9, 1982, at the 46th Street Theatre, where it ran for 729 performances. The cast included Raul Julia as Guido, Karen Akers as Luisa, Liliane Montevecchi as Liliane, Anita Morris as Carla, Shelly Burch as Claudia, Camille Saviola as Mama Maddelena, Kathi Moss as Saraghina, Cameron Johann as Young Guido, and Taina Elg as Guido's mother. Rounding out the cast were Christopher Evans Allen, Jeanie Bowers, Stephanie Cotsirilos, Kim Criswell, Kate DeZina, Colleen Dodson, Lulu Downs, Louise Edeiken, Laura Kenyon, Linda Kerns, Nancy McCall, Cynthia Meryl, Rita Rehn, Dee Etta Rowe, Jadrien Steele, Frankie Vincent, Patrick Wilcox, Alaina Warren Zachary. Raul Julia played Guido for one year, from May 9, 1982, to May 8, 1983. (Bert Convy replaced Julia while he was on vacation for two weeks, beginning January 10, 1983.) Sergio Franchi starred as Guido for 330 performances, from May 9, 1983, to February 4, 1984, the date the production closed; composer Maury Yeston added a Franchi-style ballad, "Now Is the Moment," to the lovely Italian-sounding score. Other replacements were Maureen McGovern and then Eileen Barnett as Luisa, Wanda Richert as Carla, Priscilla Lopez as Liliane, and Barbara Stock as Claudia. Once the original boys reached the required height for their roles, they were replaced by Derek Scott Lashine as Little Guido, Jeffrey Vitelli (also the understudy for Little Guido), Braden Danner, and Peter Brendon. The musical won five Tony Awards, including best musical and three Drama Desk Awards, including Best Music, Best Lyrics, and Best Musical. An original cast recording was released by Sony and was nominated for a Grammy Award.

National tour
The original plans were for the Broadway show to continue even as the National tour commenced. However the new producers (James Nederlander and Zev Buffman) made the right offer for the road show, and the Broadway production was closed so that the whole Broadway cast could go on the road with Sergio Franchi as the headliner. Nineteen cities were originally planned, but several venue changes were made during the tour. The most prominent was the canceling of a Baton Rouge venue so that show could serve for the Grand Opening of the Los Angeles Civic Light Opera season. This was to accommodate the cancellation of On Your Toes after Leslie Caron (the star) was hospitalized due to a hip injury. When the decision was made to close the road show after the San Francisco shows, Louisiana fans were upset that an alternate date had not been created for them. (Sergio Franchi was extremely popular in Louisiana.) The reviews were generally very favorable, although a DC reviewer lamented some production changes (although admitting that they had not viewed the original Broadway production). The production venue was changed from a spa to a railroad station, principally to accommodate the volume of scenery that needed to be transported from location to location. The other change lamented in DC was the lighting. One review of the Florida production acknowledged that the grey railroad station with light-studded arches may have been "even more surreal than its creators may have intended." In contrast, the San Diego reviewer expressed admiration for Marcia Madeira's "flattering light design" and declared "Nine" to be "wonderful to watch."

 1984 "Nine" – The National tour – Sergio Franchi starring as Guido Contini (although not a complete list, the following references were found):
Washington, DC – Kennedy Center Opera House – April 4, 1984 through April 21, 1984
Miami Beach, FL – Miami Beach Theater of Performing Arts – May 4, 1984 through May 17, 1984
Los Angeles – Dorothy Chandler Pavilion Music Center - May 23, 1984 through June 1, 1984
Dallas, TX – Majestic Theater – June 5, 1984 through June 17, 1984
San Diego, CA - Fox Theater - July 2, 1984 through July 7, 1984
Seattle, WA - 5th Avenue Theater - July 10, 1984 through July 15, 1984
San Francisco, CA -  Week of August 24, 1984

London productions
On June 7, 1992, the largest production of Nine to date was presented in concert in London at Royal Festival Hall with Jonathan Pryce, Becky Norman, Elizabeth Sastre, Ann Crumb, Kate Copstick, and Liliane Montevecchi. 165 people were in the cast, including male characters, as originally conceived. The production was directed by Andrew MacBean and a recording of the concert (with Elaine Paige stepping in as Claudia) was released by RCA Victor.

On December 12, 1996, a small-scale production directed by David Leveaux and choreographed by Jonathan Butterell opened at the Donmar Warehouse, where it ran for three months. Performers included Larry Lamb (Guido Contini), Ian Covington (Young Guido), Sara Kestelman (Liliane La Fleur), Clare Burt (Carla), Eleanor David (Claudia), Susannah Fellows (Luisa), Jenny Galloway (Saraghina), Ria Jones (Stephanie Necrophorus), Dilys Laye (Guido's Mother), Kiran Hocking (Our Lady of the Spa). Other cast members included Emma Dears, Kristin Marks, Tessa Pritchard, Sarah Parish, Norma Atallah and Susie Dumbreck. It was designed by Anthony Ward.

Broadway revival
In 2003, the Roundabout Theatre Company produced a Broadway revival with director Leveaux and choreographer Butterell. It opened on April 10, 2003, at the Eugene O'Neill Theatre, where it ran for 283 performances and 23 previews and won two Tony Awards, including Best Revival of a Musical. The cast included Antonio Banderas as Guido (who received a Tony Award nomination), Mary Stuart Masterson as Luisa (who received a Tony Award nomination), Chita Rivera as Liliane, Jane Krakowski as Carla (winning the Tony), Laura Benanti as Claudia, and Mary Beth Peil as Guido's mother. Replacements later in the run included John Stamos as Guido, Eartha Kitt as Liliane, Rebecca Luker as Claudia, and Marni Nixon as Guido's mother. Yeston replaced a waltz dance from the original Folies Bergere number with a showstopping Tango Duet for Banderas and Rivera, a revival cast recording was released by PS Classics. Jenna Elfman was hired and advertised to join the cast as Carla at the same time that Stamos and Kitt were joining the production. A few days before the opening it was announced she needed more rehearsal time and that her understudy Sara Gettelfinger would take over temporarily. Elfman never did join the company and Gettelfinger played the rest of the run.

International productions
The European premiere of Nine opened in Sweden, at the Oscarsteatern, Stockholm, September 23, 1983, with Ernst-Hugo Järegård (Guido), Siw Malmkvist (Luisa), Viveka Anderberg (Claudia), Suzanne Brenning (Carla), Anna Sundqvist (Saraghina), Berit Carlberg (Liliane La Fleur), Helena Fernell (Stephanie), Maj Lindström (Guido's Mother), Moa Myrén (Lady of the Spa), Ewa Roos (Mama Maddalena), and Lena Nordin (Maria).

The Australian premiere of Nine was staged in Melbourne at the Comedy Theatre in 1987. John Diedrich produced, directed and starred as Guido Contini. As Luisa Contini, Maria Mercedes's portrayal received critical acclaim and nominations for Best Actress in a Musical at the Melbourne Green Room Awards and the Sydney Theatre Critics Circle Awards . Maury Yeston after attending the Sydney opening night proclaimed that Maria Mercedes was the definitive Luisa Contini. The cast also included a young Tina Arena, the Australian singer, songwriter and actress who went on to have an international recording and performing career. Other cast members included Nancye Hayes (as Liliane La Fleur), Peta Toppano as Claudia, Caroline Gillmer as Sarragina, Jackie Rees, Gerda Nicholson, Kerry Woods, Anna Lee, Sally Anne Bourne, Alana Clark, Sally Clark, Alison Jiear, Donna Lizzio, Cammie Munro, Marie-Jackson, Sharon Jessop, Alix Longman, Lisa O'Dea, Anne Sinclair, Janice Torrens, Penny Richards, and Mimi Rubin. A cast recording of the Australian production was recorded for Polydor and later released on CD by the TER record label. It won the ARIA Award for Best Original Soundtrack or Cast Album.

The Argentinian premiere of Nine (1998) won several ACE Awards including Mejor Musial. Performers included Juan Darthes (as Guido), Elena Roger, Ligia Piro, Luz Kerz, Sandra Ballesteros, and Mirta Wons.

The musical premiered in Germany at the Theater des Westens in 1999 in Berlin.

The musical played in Malmö, Sweden at Malmö Opera in 2002 with Jan Kyhle (Guido), Marie Richardson (Luisa), Sharon Dyall (Claudia), Petra Nielsen (Carla), Marianne Mörck (Sarraghina), Lill Lindfors (Liliane La Fleur), Annica Edstam (Stephanie), and Victoria Kahn (Gudio's Mother).

A Dutch production of Nine opened in an open-air theatre in Amersfoort in June 2005. Directed by Julia Bless, the production starred René van Zinnicq Bergmann, Frédèrique Sluyterman van Loo, Marleen van der Loo, Kirsten Cools, Tine Joustra, Veronique Sodano, Aafke van der Meij, and Donna Vrijhof. The Dutch translation was by Theo Nijland.

The original Japanese production premiered in Tokyo in 2005 with Tetsuya Bessho as Guido Contini and Mizuki Ōura as Liliane La Fleur. In 2021, the Umeda Arts 2021 production in Tokyo and Osaka Nine won Japan's Yomiuri Theatre Award for Best Musical, Best Leading Actor: Yu Shirota, and Best Director: Shuntaro Fujita.

The musical premiered in San Juan, Puerto Rico in the fall of 2010 with Ernesto Concepción (Guido), Sara Jarque (Luisa), Wanda Sais (Carla), Marian Pabón (Lilliane Le Fleur), Tita Guerrero (Lina Darling), Michelle Brava (Claudia), Aidita Encarnación (Saraghina), Yezmín Luzzed (Stephanie), and Hilda Ramos (Mamma).

The Phoenix Theatre in Arizona revived Nine in the spring of 2011, starring Craig Laurie (Guido), Patti Davis Suarez (Mother), Jeannie Shubitz (Luisa), Kim Manning (Liliane), Jenny Hintze (Claudia), and Johanna Carlisle (Saraghina).

The musical premiered in Manila, the Philippines, in September 2012, produced by Atlantis Productions. Jett Pangan (Guido) alongside an all-star cast of women, scenic design by Tony Award-winning David Gallo and costume design by Robin Tomas.

The musical premiered in the Czech Republic, at the Josef Kajetán Tyl Theatre in Pilsen in December 2012.

The musical premiered in Poland, in October 2014, at the Teatr Muzyczny Capitol in Wrocław.

The Greek production opened in Pantheon Theatre in Athens in November 2015, starring Vassilis Charalampopoulos as Guido, and Helena Paparizou as Saraghina.

In 2015, the musical premiered in Brazil, at Teatro Porto Seguro, in São Paulo, directed by Charles Möeller and Claudio Botelho, starring Italian actor Nicola Lama as Guido, Carol Castro as Luisa, Totia Meireles as Lili la Fleur, Malu Rodrigues (Carla), Karen Junqueira and Vanessa Costa alternating as Claudia, Letícia Birkheuer (Stephanie), Beatriz Segall and Sonia Clara alternating as Guido's mother, and Myra Ruiz (Saraghina).

A Spanish production premiered on June 7, 2018 at the Teatro Amaya in Madrid, with a cast formed by Alvaro Puertas (Guido), Roko (Luisa), Patrizia Ruiz (Claudia), Chanel Terrero (Carla), Marcela Paoli (Liliane Le Fleur), Idaira Fernández (Saraghina), Chus Herranz (Stephanie), and Angels Jiménez (Guido's Mother).

Casting

Film 

On April 12, 2007, Variety announced that Rob Marshall would direct a feature film adaptation of Nine for the Weinstein Company. Marshall had previously directed Chicago for the Weinsteins while they were still at Miramax. The screenplay is written by Anthony Minghella with Michael Tolkin serving as an uncredited co-scripter. The cast consists of Academy Award winners Daniel Day-Lewis, Marion Cotillard, Penélope Cruz, Judi Dench, Nicole Kidman, and Sophia Loren, with Academy Award nominee and Golden Globe winner Kate Hudson and Grammy winning singer Fergie. Among other cast changes in the film version, the character of Mama Maddelena does not appear, and Claudia's surname was changed from Nardi to Jenssen. The script makes Guido 50 (Day-Lewis's actual age), not 40 as in the stage original. The film's final coda is more hopeful and optimistic than the stage version.  In addition, director Marshall cut most of the original production's score, with only "Overture delle Donne," "Guido's Song," "A Call from the Vatican," "Folies Bergeres," "Be Italian," "My Husband Makes Movies," "Unusual Way," and an extended version of "I Can't Make This Movie" making it into the final edit of the film. Composer Maury Yeston wrote three new songs for the movie including "Cinema Italiano," "Guarda la Luna" to replace the title song, and "Take It All" in place of "Be On Your Own," as well as the instrumental concluding the film.  The film is co-produced by Marshall's own production company Lucamar Productions. The film was released in the US on December 18, 2009, in New York and Los Angeles and opened for wide release on December 25, 2009.

Musical numbers

Act I
 "Overture Delle Donne" – Company
 "Not Since Chaplin" – Company
 "Guido's Song" – Guido
 "Not Since Chaplin - Reprise" – Company
 "The Germans at the Spa" – Maddelena, Italians and Germans
 "Not Since Chaplin - Reprise" – Company
 "My Husband Makes Movies" – Luisa
 "A Call from the Vatican" – Carla
 "Only with You" – Guido
 "The Script" – Guido
 "Folies Bergeres" – Lilli, Stephanie and Company
 "Nine" – Guido's Mother and Company
 "Ti Voglio Bene/Be Italian" – Saraghina, Boys and Company
 "The Bells of St. Sebastian" – Guido and Company

Act II
 "A Man Like You/Unusual Way/Duet" – Claudia and Guido
 "The Grand Canal" (Every Girl in Venice/Amor/Only You) – Guido and Company
 "Simple" – Carla
 "Be On Your Own" – Luisa
 "Not Since Chaplin – Reprise" – Company
 "I Can't Make This Movie" – Guido
 "Getting Tall" – Young Guido
 "Long Ago/Nine - Reprise" – Guido, Young Guido and Luisa 

Maury Yeston added a new number, "Now is the Moment" for Sergio Franchi.
The 2003 revival eliminated "The Germans at the Spa".

Cast recordings

 1982 Broadway Cast (starring Raúl Julia)
 1987 Australian Cast (starring John Diedrich)
 1992 London Concert (starring Jonathan Pryce)
 1997 French Cast (starring Jérôme Pradon)
 1999 Berlin Cast
 2003 Broadway Revival (starring Antonio Banderas)
 2005 Tokyo Cast (starring Tetsuya Bessho)
 2009 Film (starring Daniel Day-Lewis)
 2017 Polish Cast (starring Damian Aleksander)
 2019 Czech Cast (starring Petr Gazdík)
 2020 Japanese Cast (starring Yu Shirota)

Awards and nominations

Original Broadway production

Original London production

2003 Broadway revival

References

External links
 
Maury Yeston's Nine page

1982 musicals
Broadway musicals
Drama Desk Award-winning musicals
Musicals based on films
Works about film directors and producers
Tony Award for Best Musical
Compositions by Maury Yeston
Adaptations of works by Federico Fellini
Tony Award-winning musicals